In computer graphics, alpha compositing or alpha blending is the process of combining one image with a background to create the appearance of partial or full transparency. It is often useful to render picture elements (pixels) in separate passes or layers and then combine the resulting 2D images into a single, final image called the composite. Compositing is used extensively in film when combining computer-rendered image elements with live footage. Alpha blending is also used in 2D computer graphics to put rasterized foreground elements over a background.

In order to combine the picture elements of the images correctly, it is necessary to keep an associated matte for each element in addition to its color. This matte layer contains the coverage information—the shape of the geometry being drawn—making it possible to distinguish between parts of the image where something was drawn and parts that are empty.

Although the most basic operation of combining two images is to put one over the other, there are many operations, or blend modes, that are used.

Description
In a 2D image a color combination is stored for each picture element (pixel), often a combination of red, green and blue (RGB). When alpha compositing is in use, each pixel has an additional numeric value stored in its alpha channel, with a value ranging from 0 to 1. A value of 0 means that the pixel is fully transparent and the color in the pixel beneath will show through. A value of 1 means that the pixel is fully opaque.

With the existence of an alpha channel, it is possible to express compositing image operations using a compositing algebra. For example, given two images A and B, the most common compositing operation is to combine the images so that A appears in the foreground and B appears in the background. This can be expressed as A over B. In addition to over, Porter and Duff defined the compositing operators in, held out by (the phrase refers to holdout matting and is usually abbreviated out), atop, and xor (and the reverse operators rover, rin, rout, and ratop) from a consideration of choices in blending the colors of two pixels when their coverage is, conceptually, overlaid orthogonally:

As an example, the over operator can be accomplished by applying the following formula to each pixel:

The over operator is, in effect, the normal painting operation (see Painter's algorithm). Bruce A. Wallace derived the over operator based on a physical reflectance/transmittance model, as opposed to Duff's geometrical approach. The in and out operators are the alpha compositing equivalent of clipping. The two use only the alpha channel of the second image and ignore the color components.

Straight versus premultiplied 
If an alpha channel is used in an image, there are two common representations that are available: straight (unassociated) alpha and premultiplied (associated) alpha.
 With straight alpha, the RGB components represent the color of the object or pixel, disregarding its opacity.
 With premultiplied alpha, the RGB components represent the emission of the object or pixel, and the alpha represents the occlusion. The over operator then becomes:

A more obvious advantage of this is that, in certain situations, it can save a subsequent multiplication (e.g. if the image is used many times during later compositing). However, the most significant advantages of using premultiplied alpha are for correctness and simplicity rather than performance: premultiplied alpha allows correct filtering and blending. In addition, premultiplied alpha allows regions of regular alpha blending and regions with additive blending mode to be encoded within the same image.

Assuming that the pixel color is expressed using straight (non-premultiplied) RGBA tuples, a pixel value of (0, 0.7, 0, 0.5) implies a pixel that has 70% of the maximum green intensity and 50% opacity. If the color were fully green, its RGBA would be (0, 1, 0, 0.5).

However, if this pixel uses premultiplied alpha, all of the RGB values (0, 0.7, 0) are multiplied, or scaled for occlusion, by the alpha value 0.5, which is appended to yield (0, 0.35, 0, 0.5). In this case, the 0.35 value for the G channel actually indicates 70% green emission intensity (with 50% occlusion). A pure green emission would be encoded as (0, 0.5, 0, 0.5). Knowing whether a file uses straight or premultiplied alpha is essential to correctly process or composite it, as a different calculation is required. It is also entirely acceptable to have an RGBA triplet express emission with no occlusion, such as (0.4, 0.3, 0.2, 0.0). Fires and flames, glows, flares, and other such phenomena can only be represented using associated / premultiplied alpha.

The only important difference is in the dynamic range of the color representation in finite precision numerical calculations (which is in all applications): premultiplied alpha has a unique representation for transparent pixels, avoiding the need to choose a "clear color" or resultant artifacts such as edge fringes (see the next paragraphs). In an associated / premultiplied alpha image, the RGB represents the emission amount, while the alpha is occlusion. Premultiplied alpha has some practical advantages over normal alpha blending because interpolation and filtering give correct results.

Ordinary interpolation without premultiplied alpha leads to RGB information leaking out of fully transparent (A=0) regions, even though this RGB information is ideally invisible. When interpolating or filtering images with abrupt borders between transparent and opaque regions, this can result in borders of colors that were not visible in the original image. Errors also occur in areas of semitransparency because the RGB components are not correctly weighted, giving incorrectly high weighting to the color of the more transparent (lower alpha) pixels.

Premultiplication can reduce the available relative precision in the RGB values when using integer or fixed-point representation for the color components, which may cause a noticeable loss of quality if the color information is later brightened or if the alpha channel is removed. In practice, this is not usually noticeable because during typical composition operations, such as OVER, the influence of the low-precision color information in low-alpha areas on the final output image (after composition) is correspondingly reduced. This loss of precision also makes premultiplied images easier to compress using certain compression schemes, as they do not record the color variations hidden inside transparent regions, and can allocate fewer bits to encode low-alpha areas. The same “limitations” of lower quantisation bit depths such as 8 bit per channel are also present in imagery without alpha, and this argument is problematic as a result.

Gamma correction 

The RGB values of typical digital images do not directly correspond to the physical light intensities, but are rather compressed by a gamma correction function:

 

This transformation better utilizes the limited number of bits in the encoded image by choosing  that better matches the non-linear human perception of luminance.

Accordingly, computer programs that deal with such images must decode the RGB values into a linear space (by undoing the gamma-compression), blend the linear light intensities, and re-apply the gamma compression to the result:

When combined with premultiplied alpha, pre-multiplication is done in linear space, prior to gamma compression. This results in the following formula:

Note that only the color components undergo gamma-correction; the alpha channel is always linear.

Other transparency methods

Although used for similar purposes, transparent colors and image masks do not permit the smooth blending of the superimposed image pixels with those of the background (only whole image pixels or whole background pixels allowed).

A similar effect can be achieved with a 1-bit alpha channel, as found in the 16-bit RGBA high color mode of the Truevision TGA image file format and related TARGA and AT-Vista/NU-Vista display adapters' high color graphic mode. This mode devotes 5 bits for every primary RGB color (15-bit RGB) plus a remaining bit as the "alpha channel".

Screendoor transparency can be used to simulate partial occlusion where only 1-bit alpha is available.

For some applications, a single alpha channel is not sufficient: a stained-glass window, for instance, requires a separate transparency channel for each RGB channel to model the red, green and blue transparency separately. More alpha channels can be added for accurate spectral color filtration applications.

Some order-independent transparency methods replace the over operator with a commutative approximation.

History 

The use of the term alpha is explained by Smith as follows: "We called it that because of the classic linear interpolation formula  that uses the Greek letter  (alpha) to control the amount of interpolation between, in this case, two images A and B".

See also

References

External links
 Compositing Digital Images - Thomas Porter and Tom Duff (Original Paper)
 Image Compositing Fundamentals
 Understand Compositing and Color extensions in SVG 1.2 in 30 minutes!
 Alpha Matting and Premultiplication

Computer graphics algorithms